Right Of Way/Ocean station is a light rail stop on the Muni Metro M Ocean View line, located in the Merced Manor neighborhood of San Francisco, California. It opened in 1925 with the first phase of the line. The station is located where the line's private right-of-way crosses Ocean Avenue, with narrow side platforms located on the near side of the grade crossing. The northbound platform is across the tracks from the southbound platform of Right Of Way/Eucalyptus station. The stop is not accessible to people with disabilities.

The stop is also served by the  route which provides service along the M Ocean View line during the early morning when trains do not operate.

References

External links 

SFMTA – Right Of Way/Ocean Ave inbound and outbound
SFBay Transit (unofficial) – Right Of Way/Ocean Ave

Muni Metro stations
Railway stations in the United States opened in 1925